Thornton A. Jenkins (11 December 1811 – 9 August 1893) was an officer in the United States Navy, who served during the Mexican–American War and the American Civil War.  He later served as chief of the Bureau of Navigation and as president of the United States Naval Institute. Jenkins retired as a rear admiral.

Early life and career
Born at Orange Court House, Virginia, Jenkins entered the Navy as a midshipman on 1 November 1828, and served first in the West Indies in an expedition against pirates and slavers. Examined for a commission as lieutenant, he placed first among 82 candidates. In 1831 Jenkins helped to suppress Nat Turner's slave rebellion.

Prior to the Mexican–American War, Jenkins served with the Coast Survey and with the Brazilian and Mediterranean Squadrons. Later, he commanded the store-ship  and the supply station at Salmedena Island. In the interval between the wars, he served in the receiving ship at Baltimore, returned to the Coast Survey, and was secretary of the Lighthouse Board.

Civil War service

His Civil War record was distinguished. In 1861 Jenkins performed secret services for President Lincoln, until he became ill in 1861. After this, Jenkins became a captain and served primarily in the West Gulf Blockading Squadron of David Farragut, he commanded . He served as chief of staff to Farragut, and was later wounded while commanding a convoy escort group. Admiral Farragut had temporarily gone to New Orleans on business at the time. Jenkins later commanded a division of the squadron. He was present at the Battle of Mobile Bay and heard Farragut utter the famous line "Damn the torpedoes, full speed ahead." Though, according to Thornton, what Farragut actually said was "Go ahead sir and damn the torpedoes!"

Postwar activities
Jenkins was chief of the Bureau of Navigation, from 1865 to 1869.  He became a real admiral in 1870 and commanded the Asiatic Squadron from 1870 until his retirement in 1873. Rear Admiral Jenkins was president of the Naval Institute from 1883 to 1885, and died on 9 August 1893. Jenkins was buried at Arlington National Cemetery.

Namesakes
 Two destroyers of the United States Navy have been named  in his honor.
 His grandson, Thornton Jenkins Hains, a novelist and murder suspect.
 Father-In-Law of Florence Foster Jenkins

References

  Marshall, Amy K., Frequently Close to the Point of Peril : A History of Buoys and Tenders in U.S. Coastal Waters, 1789–1939. April 1997.  Thesis, Master of Arts in Maritime History/Nautical Archaeology, East Carolina University.  Online.  December 1999.  U.S. Coast Guard.  Viewed 1 March 2006.

External links
 Destroyer History Foundation – Rear Admiral Thornton A. Jenkins, namesake of USS Jenkins (DD-447; later DDE-447)

 Thornton A. Jenkins at ArlingtonCemetery.net, an unofficial website

1811 births
1893 deaths
United States Navy rear admirals
United States Navy personnel of the Mexican–American War
Members of the Aztec Club of 1847
Union Navy officers
People from Orange, Virginia
People of Virginia in the American Civil War
Burials at Arlington National Cemetery